333 Premium Export Beer, simply 333 and formerly 33 Beer is a beer brewed in Vietnam. It is now made by Sabeco Brewery.

33 Beer was the original name of this Vietnamese beer, pronounced "Ba Mười Ba" in Vietnamese, which means "thirty-three. It was well-known among American GIs during the war in Vietnam in the 1960s and 1970s.

History 
In 1975, when South Vietnam fell to the North Vietnamese, the communist government changed the name of the beer to "333 Premium Export Beer" in order to distance itself from its colonial origins. It was prepared as a rice beer. 

33 Beer's name was derived from its original 33-centilitre (11.2 ounce) bottles from the early 1900s.

33 Beer originated in France using a German recipe and ingredients. It acquired the German label 33 at the turn of the century. Production later moved to Saigon (now Ho Chi Minh City) and it became one of the leading beers in Vietnam. It was popular among American GIs during the Vietnam War. 333 Premium Export Beer became available in the American market in 1994. It is also available in Canada, Hong Kong, Japan, Singapore and Australia.

See also
Beer in Vietnam
Bia hơi
Habeco
Hanoi Beer
Huda Beer
Huế Beer
Sabeco Brewery

References

External links 

Beer in Vietnam
Beer brands
Vietnamese brands